Argentina was one of the founding members of the OTI Festival and debuted in the event in 1972 when the first contest was held in Madrid. Canal 7 and Canal 13 Argentina were the two OTI member broadcasters that organised the Argentine participation in the event. Since their debut, this country participated regularly in the festival (except for 1974) till 2000, when the last edition took place. All the Argentine representatives in the show were selected internally.

History 
Argentina was one of the most iconic and successful countries in the history of the OTI Festival. The two broadcasters managed to win the contest on four occasions. The first win came in 1979 in Caracas by Daniel Riolobos and his song "Cuenta conmigo" (Count on me) which turned into a hit. Some years later, in 1988 Argentina won the festival for second time with Guillermo Guido and his song "Todavía eres mi mujer" (You're still my wife). In 1991, in Acapulco (México) the South American country won for a third time with Claudia Brant and her song "Adonde estás ahora?" (Where are you now?). Three years later, in the Spanish city of Valencia, the country won for fourth and last time with Claudia Clarenzio and her elegantly performed song "Canción despareja" (Unlinked song).

Apart from their victories, Argentina achieved second place on another four occasions in 1981, with Marianella and her song "Súbete a mi nube" (Ride in my cloud), in 1985, with Marcelo Alejandro and his song "Y tu, prohibida" (And you... Forbidden)", in 1996, with the return of Guillermo Guido and his song "Cuanto te amo" (How much I love you) and in 1998, with Alicia Vignola with her song "Sin amor" (Without love).

Argentina also achieved two third places in 1980 with Luis Ordoñez and 1986 with Hugo Marcel.

Contestants 

Guillermo Guido's four appearances are of note, as he returned to the event in 1996 and 2000 after his victory in 1988.

OTI Festival
Argentine culture